Ana Goñi (born 19 April 1953) is a Venezuelan rally co-driver and motorsport personality. She is best known as the co-driver of Swedish rally legend Stig Blomqvist. Aside from her motorsport interests, Goñi is the owner of Spanish vineyard Bodega Otazu. She has a collection of classic rally cars.

Career
Goñi's first World Rally Championship event was the 1999 Rally of Great Britain, sitting alongside Mike Corns in a Mitsubishi Lancer EVO where they finished in 49th place.

In 2000, Goñi partnered Stig Blomqvist in a Mitsubishi, again in the Rally Great Britain. After a good run, they retired from the event with suspension damage. WRC season 2001 saw the pair compete in 12 rounds of the World Rally Championship for production cars, ending the season in a creditable 5th place in a Mitsubishi. The pair stayed loyal to the Japanese marque until 2003, when, after a brief foray with a Škoda Octavia WRC, they opted for a David Sutton Motorsport prepared Subaru Impreza.

The pair retired from the WRC in 2006 although they still make sporadic appearances and often compete together in classic rally events.

Personal life
Goñi's parents were Spanish Basque and Argentinian immigrants. She has three children and is divorced. She owns the Bodega Otazu vineyard in Spain.

References

External links
 Rallybase stat page
 Rallye-info stat page
 Bodega Otazu website
 David Sutton Rally Car Museum

1953 births
Living people
Venezuelan rally co-drivers
World Rally Championship co-drivers